Hygrocybe collucera is a mushroom of the waxcap genus Hygrocybe. It grows in moist, shady conditions. A rare species, it is only found near Sydney. It was described in 2001 by the mycologist Anthony M. Young.

References

Fungi described in 2001
Fungi of Australia
collucera